Masonite is a type of hardboard, a kind of engineered wood, which is made of steam-cooked and pressure-molded wood fibers in a process patented by William H. Mason. It is also called Quartrboard, Isorel, hernit, karlit, torex, treetex, and pressboard.

History
A product resembling masonite (hardboard) was first made in England in 1898 by hot-pressing waste paper. Masonite was patented in 1924 in Laurel, Mississippi, by William H. Mason, who was a friend and protégé of Thomas Edison. Mass production started in 1929. In the 1930s and 1940s, Masonite was used for applications including doors, roofing, walls, desktops, and canoes. It was sometimes used for house siding.

Similar "tempered hardboard" is now a generic product made by many forest product companies. The Masonite Corporation entered the door business as a supplier of facings in 1972, and was purchased in 2001 by Premdor Corporation, a door maker, from its former parent International Paper. It no longer supplies generic hardboard.

Production
Forming the fibers into boards on a screen, the boards are then pressed and heated to form the finished product with a smooth burnished finish. (Later a dry process with two burnished surfaces was also used.) The original lignin in the wood serves to bond the fibers without any added adhesive. The long fibers give Masonite a high bending strength, tensile strength, density, and stability. Unlike other composite wood panels, no formaldehyde-based resins are used to bind the fibers in Masonite.

Use

Artists have often used it as a support for painting, and in artistic media such as linocut printing. Masonite's smooth surface makes it a suitable material for table tennis tables and skateboard ramps.

Masonite is used by moving companies. Among other things, they use it to protect the walls of buildings where they work, and lay on floors to enable smooth rolling of dollies loaded with goods.

Masonite is widely used in construction, particularly in renovations where floors are finished prior to other work and require protection. Sheets of  Masonite are typically laid over red rosin paper on finished floors to protect them. The Masonite sheets are taped together with duct tape to prevent shifting and to keep substances from leaking through.

Masonite is used extensively in the construction of sets for theater, film and television. It is especially common in theaters as the stage floor, painted matte black.

It is considered one of the best materials for making a musical wobble board.

Masonite  panels are sometimes sawn into  by 8-foot strips. These strips are used to form the edge of sidewalks where curved shapes are desired when pouring concrete.

Masonite is a popular choice for cake boards for professional cake decorators, since it is a natural product and is strong enough to support multiple-tiered creations such as wedding cakes.

To a lesser extent, Masonite is used in guitar bodies, most notably by Danelectro.

Due to its low cost and flexibility, Masonite is widely used as the curved surface of skateboard ramps.

Masonite was a popular protective backing for wooden console stereo and television cabinets from the 1960s to the 1980s.

Due to its flexibility, Masonite is commonly used by model railroaders for their layouts as fascia, to cover the structural materials used for the layout.

Deterioration 
Masonite swells and rots over time when exposed to the elements, and may prematurely deteriorate when it is used as exterior siding. In 1996, International Paper (IP) lost a class action suit brought by homeowners whose Masonite siding had deteriorated. The jury found that IP's Masonite siding was defective.

See also
 Engineered wood
 Fiberboard
 Glued laminated timber
 Hardboard
 Haskelite
 The Love Embrace of the Universe, the Earth (Mexico), Myself, Diego, and Señor Xolotl by Frida Kahlo
 Masonite International
 Medium-density fiberboard (MDF)
 Oriented strand board
 Paintings on Masonite by Joan Miró
 Particle board
 Plywood
 Pressed wood

References

External links 

Masonite Doors

Engineered wood
Jones County, Mississippi
1924 introductions
English inventions